The seventh season of Desperate Housewives, a television series created by Marc Cherry, began airing on September 26, 2010, and concluded on May 15, 2011. The deceased Mary Alice Young continues to narrate the events in the lives of her friends and Wisteria Lane residents, Susan Delfino, Lynette Scavo, Bree Van de Kamp and Gabrielle Solis. New housewife Renee Perry is introduced in this season. Paul Young returns to the lane and is the center of this season's mystery.

According to Cherry, he had intended for the series to conclude after its seventh season, but the eighth season ended up being the series' final season. The first episode of the season aired in Latin America on October 6, 2010. Season 7 premiered in Ireland on Tuesday, October 12, 2010. Season 7 began airing in the United Kingdom on October 17, 2010. It started airing at 9:00pm on October 25, 2010 on OSN's Show Series in the Middle East. It began airing in Israel on December 12, 2010. Season 7 began airing in France in the translated version on April 14, 2011 on Canal Plus.

The series saw the lowest ratings in its history in the seventh season. In the first 12 episodes, the series attracted very similar viewership to the second half of the sixth season and hit season highs of 4.4 in the 18-49 demographic and continued around 3.5 - 4.3 until mid January. But after the thirteenth episode of season seven, "I'm Still Here", the ratings declined heavily because of the consecutive competition from the 68th Golden Globe Awards and then saw even lower numbers, against the 2011 Grammy Awards and then the Country Music Association Awards. "Desperate Housewives" lost many viewers in the second half of its season, and unlike the previous season, it failed to pick up again towards the end of the season. The show hit series lows of 2.7 in 18-49 demographic twice and continued to receive ratings between 2.7 - 3.1 in the last 11 episodes with the exception of "Searching" which was promoted by ABC after the 83rd Academy Awards and had a lead in from the season premiere of Secret Millionaire. This is the first time in its history that it did not place in the 20 most watched shows, ranking as the 26th most watched show, although it did place as the 13th most watched scripted show during the 2010-11 television season. The season averaged 11.85 million viewers per episode and is ABC's third most watched scripted show in total viewers after Body of Proof and Modern Family. In the 18-49 demographic, the show ranked 20th.

Cast

The seventh season had thirteen roles receiving star billing, with eight out of twelve returning from the previous season. The series is narrated by Brenda Strong, who portrays the deceased Mary Alice Young, as she observes from beyond the grave the lives of the Wisteria Lane residents and her former best friends. Teri Hatcher portrayed Susan Delfino, who has moved out of the lane following a financial crisis. Felicity Huffman portrayed Lynette Scavo, who endures extreme marital problems. Marcia Cross portrayed Bree Van de Kamp, now divorced and starting a relationship with her contractor. Eva Longoria portrayed Gabrielle Solis, who discovers that her eldest daughter was switched at birth. Ricardo Antonio Chavira portrayed Carlos Solis, Gabrielle's husband who is close to discover the truth about his mother's death. Doug Savant portrayed Tom Scavo, Lynette's husband who is keeping a secret from her. James Denton portrayed Mike Delfino, Susan's husband who decides to take a job in Alaska in order to earn more money. Former Ugly Betty star Vanessa Williams joined the cast as a sort of fifth lead (following the departure of three supporting housewives over the previous two seasons) in the role of Renee Perry, Lynette's best friend from college. Several years after leaving the contractually bound cast following the second season, Mark Moses returned in the role of Paul Young, Mary Alice's widower whose mysterious arc is the season's main storyline. Kathryn Joosten was promoted from "also starring" to a formal "starring" castmember in the role of elderly neighbor Karen McCluskey. Former recurring guest stars Kevin Rahm and Tuc Watkins were also promoted to "starring" castmembers respectively playing Lee McDermott and Bob Hunter, a gay couple. Kyle MacLachlan asked to be let go from the main cast after the sixth season to pursue other projects, but he made two guest appearances during this season as Orson Hodge, Bree's ex-husband.

Also starring were Charlie Carver as Porter Scavo and Joshua Logan Moore as Parker Scavo, Lynette's sons, as well as child actors Madison De La Garza as Juanita Solis, Gabrielle's oldest daughter, and Mason Vale Cotton as M.J. Delfino, Susan's son. The role of Penny Scavo was recast, with Kendall Applegate being replaced by Darcy Rose Byrnes. Andrea Bowen left the "also starring" cast, but returned as a guest star during one episode as Julie Mayer, Susan's daughter.

This season featured many established and new guest stars. Part of Susan's storyline were Lainie Kazan portraying Maxine Rosen, Susan's landlady who also hires her to model on her erotic website, Lesley Ann Warren returning as Sophie Bremmer, Susan's mother who is now fighting cancer, Gregory Itzin featuring as Dick Barrows, a dialysis patient encountered by Susan, Aaron Lustig acting as Craig Lynwood, Fairview Memorial Hospital's transplant coordinator, and John Rubinstein in the role of Principal Hobson, headmaster at M.J.'s school and Susan's former boss. Part of Lynette's storyline were Max Carver playing Preston Scavo, another of Lynette's sons, Lois Smith portraying Allison Scavo, Tom's mother, Polly Bergen returning as Stella Wingfield, Lynette's troublesome mother, Larry Hagman appearing as Frank Kaminsky, Stella's new husband, and Brent and Shane Kinsman reprising their roles as the younger versions of Preston and Porter in flashbacks. Part of Bree's storyline were Shawn Pyfrom and Joy Lauren in the roles of Bree's son and daughter, Andrew and Danielle Van de Kamp, Brian Austin Green appearing as Keith Watson, Bree's contractor and lover for the first part of the season, John Schneider and Nancy Travis respectively playing Richard Watson and Mary Wagner, Keith's parents, Rochelle Aytes appearing as Amber James, the mother of Keith's son, Dakin Matthews playing Reverend Sykes, reverend at the local Presbyterian church, and future series regular Jonathan Cake in the role of Chuck Vance, a detective and Bree's lover towards the end of the season. Part of Gabrielle's storyline were Daniella Baltodano portraying Celia Solis, Gabrielle's youngest daughter, Rolando Molina and Carla Jimenez respectively playing Hector and Carmen Sanchez, Juanita's biological parents and the legal parents of Carlos and Gabrielle's biological daughter Grace, Stephanie Faracy in the role of Miss Charlotte, a doll store owner, and Tony Plana appearing towards the end of the season as Alejandro Perez, Gabrielle's perverted stepfather. Part of the main mystery arc were Harriet Sansom Harris returning as Felicia Tilman, who still seeks revenge on Paul after he killed her sister, Emily Bergl portraying Beth Young, Paul's new wife, former series regular Cody Kasch in the role of Zach Young, Mary Alice and Paul's son, and Steven Culp and Christine Estabrook reprising their roles as Rex Van de Kamp (Bree's deceased first husband) and Martha Huber (Felicia's sister who was killed by Paul) in the season premiere in a series of flashbacks that explained the events that led to the development of main mystery of the season. Orson Bean played Roy Bender, now married to Mrs. McCluskey, while Mindy Sterling appeared as Mitzi Kinsky, another resident of Wisteria Lane.

Episodes

Ratings

United States (On ABC)

*This episode was interrupted during its original airing by the breaking news of Osama Bin Laden's death which may have resulted in a lower than expected rating than usual.

United Kingdom (On Channel 4)
In the UK, the season first airs on E4 on Sunday nights at 10pm, and on Channel 4 on Wednesday nights at 10pm.

aViewers in millions.
*These 4 episodes aired at the later time of 10:30pm on Channel 4.

The show took a break at Christmas  until April and eventually returned to its previous time-slots of airing on E4 on Sundays, and on Channel 4 on Wednesdays. The series eventually returned on April 13, 2011 on Channel 4 and E4 from Sunday, April 17, 2011.

Canadian Ratings (On CTV)

New Zealand on TV2
The Seventh Season began in New Zealand on 14 February 2011 around the time it always has in the 8:30pm Monday timeslot which it has had for all 7 years. The season ended on July 18, 2011 with the highest rating of the show since Season 5 of 525,000 viewers. It also marks the first time in the series history in which episodes have aired consistently each week with no breaks. This season average 418,555 viewers.

All ratings sourced from: Throng Ratings. The first episode premièred to what was a series low rating of only 375,000 viewers but was still one of the highest rating shows for the night. The next 2 episodes rose steadily while Episode 4 hit an impressive 444,790 viewers. Episode 5 managed to remain around this high while the next 4 episodes only managed to hover below 400,000. Episode 10 managed 431,000 viewers while Episode 11 dropped to just under 400,000. Episode 12 pulled in a massive 460,000 viewers and at that point was the highest rated episode of the season. Up until episode 21, the ratings moved between over 390,000 viewers to 430,000 viewers. Episode 21 hit over 450,000 viewers while Episode 22 hit a series low 370,090 viewers. Episode 23 (season finale) premièred after a television special and pulled in 525,575 viewers, the highest in nearly 3 years for the show.

Ireland On RTÉ 2
 Desperate Housewives airs Tuesdays at 9:55pm on RTÉ 2.
 All ratings below are supplied from The RTÉ Guide. The ratings are supplied by TAM Ireland/Nielsen TAM.
 Season 7 averaged 437,348 viewers, down a little from the sixth season's average.

 Episode 155 was scheduled to start at 10:05pm but was delayed until 10:15pm due to the 2011 Eurovision Semi-Final 1 running 10 minutes over.

DVD release

References

External links 
 

 
2010 American television seasons
2011 American television seasons